Laestrygones is a genus of South Pacific araneomorph spiders in the family Toxopidae, and was first described by A. T. Urquhart in 1894.

Species
 it contains six species from New Zealand and Tasmania:
Laestrygones albiceris Urquhart, 1894 (type) – New Zealand
Laestrygones chathamensis Forster, 1970 – New Zealand (Chatham Is.)
Laestrygones minutissimus (Hogg, 1909) – New Zealand (Auckland Is., Campbell Is.)
Laestrygones otagoensis Forster, 1970 – New Zealand
Laestrygones setosus Hickman, 1969 – Australia (Tasmania)
Laestrygones westlandicus Forster, 1970 – New Zealand

References

Araneomorphae genera
Toxopidae